The Gosbank Building is a constructivist building designed by Andrey Kryachkov. It is located on Krasny Avenue in Novosibirsk, Russia. The building is a part of the architectural ensemble of Lenin Square.

History
The Construction of the building began in 1929 and was completed in 1930.

Gallery

See also
 Oblpotrebsoyuz Building
 Polyclinic No. 1

Bibliography

External links
 The Gosbank. Novosibdom.ru
 The Gosbank Building. The Constructivist Project.
 The Gosbank Building. The Novosibirsk government. Official website.

Tsentralny City District, Novosibirsk
Buildings and structures in Novosibirsk
Constructivist architecture
Commercial buildings completed in 1930
Cultural heritage monuments of regional significance in Novosibirsk Oblast